The 1928 South Dakota Coyotes football team was an American football team that represented the University of South Dakota in the North Central Conference (NCC) during the 1928 college football season. In its second season under head coach Vincent E. Montgomery, the team compiled a 3–5 record (1–3 against NCC opponents), finished in sixth place out of six teams in the NCC, and was outscored by a total of 77 to 71.  The team played its home games at Inman Field in Vermillion, South Dakota.

Schedule

References

South Dakota
South Dakota Coyotes football seasons
South Dakota Coyotes football